The Holley-Mason Building is a historic six-story building in Spokane, Washington. It was designed by architect Albert Held in the Renaissance Revival style, and built in 1905 at a cost of $200,000 for the Holley-Mason Hardware Company. It has been listed on the National Register of Historic Places since October 13, 1983.

References

	
National Register of Historic Places in Spokane County, Washington
Renaissance Revival architecture in Washington (state)
Buildings and structures completed in 1905
1905 establishments in Washington (state)